The Stuart Richardson House (affectionately named 'Scherzo' by Frank Lloyd Wright) in Glen Ridge, Essex County, New Jersey, United States, was built in 1951 for Stuart Richardson (an actuary) and his wife Elisabeth. The Richardsons, with their two daughters Margot and Edith, moved in on October 23, 1951, and owned the house until 1970. It is one of Wright's "Usonian" homes, designed to be functional houses for people of average means. The primary building construction materials employed in the design of the house were red brick, old growth tidewater cypress wood, and glass on a Cherokee red radiant heated concrete floor mat.

The Richardson House, originally designed in 1941 to be built in Livingston, New Jersey was built a decade later in Glen Ridge due to complexities imposed by World War II. The design is an extremely rare example of a Wright Usonian home based on hexagonal geometry - all angles of the floor plan are either 60 or 120 degrees.  Tucked into a landscaped woodland meadow with a stream, multiple ponds, and waterfalls running along its private entry invisible from the street, it is 20 miles/45 minutes from midtown Manhattan. The home's centerpiece is a massive triangular living/dining space with prow-like wood-burning fireplace, a unique sculptural inverted truss pyramidal ceiling unlike any other known to be designed by FLLW, and illuminated clerestory windows with perforated motifs whose design relates to Wright's name ('Scherzo') of the home. Fourteen floor-to-ceiling French doors create two window walls opening onto balconies and an in-ground heated swimming pool surrounded by a flagstone terrace on the south side of the home, effectively blurring indoor and outdoor space. On the north side of the home off the bedroom loggia is a large triangular planted terrace providing additional outdoor living space. 

In addition to the spacious triangular living/dining area, the home also includes a carport, entry/loggia, large kitchen, library/studio, two bedrooms, a guest bathroom, a master suite with separate bedroom/dressing area/master bath, and mechanical room. Every room contains the original desks, dressers, shelving, tables, chairs, and credenzas designed by Wright, and there is ample storage space integrated throughout the home. A recent ten year restoration by previous owners Edith and John Payne with New Jersey based TARANTINOarchitect returned The Richardson House to the integrity and beauty FLLW originally envisioned, and earned the 2010 Frank Lloyd Wright Building Conservancy Spirit Award for outstanding stewardship to private individuals in the conservation of their FLLW designed homes.

References

 Storrer, William Allin. The Frank Lloyd Wright Companion. University Of Chicago Press, 2006,  (S.282)
 On the Trail of Frank Lloyd Wright - New York Times, October 14, 2001

External links
 A floor plan of the Richardson House from ARTSTOR (an online resource for digital images from museums and universities)
 Exploring Art - Frank Lloyd Wright - Stuart Richardson Residence 
 CUTTINGS; Landscaping to Flow With a Wright House - New York Times
 Frank Lloyd Wright - Richardson House | Tarantino Architect
 Stuart Richardson House 1941 Glen Ridge New Jersey Usonian House USA. 
 Listing on home in 2019 with photographs

Frank Lloyd Wright buildings
Houses in Essex County, New Jersey
Houses completed in 1951